Appleton-le-Moors is a village and civil parish in the Ryedale district of North Yorkshire, England. According to the 2001 census it had a population of 183, reducing to 164 in the 2011 census. Historically part of the North Riding of Yorkshire, the village is in the North York Moors National Park, and is near to Pickering and Kirkbymoorside.

This ancient village is recorded in the Domesday Book and retains its classic mediaeval layout. It is a site of archaeological interest, being a rich source of finds such as flint tools, Roman coins and a mediaeval oven. It is particularly noted for its exceptionally fine 19th century church which has earned the description "the little gem of moorland churches" and is Grade I listed. It was designed by the architect J.L. Pearson in French Gothic style with elaborate decoration, a tower surmounted with a spire, and a beautiful west-facing rose window of the 10-part (i.e. botanical) design similar to the White Rose of York, with stained-glass panels depicting Christian virtues such as Faith, Hope and Charity. The church and the village hall (formerly a school) were built by Mary Shepherd, widow of Joseph Shepherd (1804–62) who was born in Appleton-le-Moors, went to sea, and became a shipowner and a very rich man. Joseph and Mary are buried in Lastingham churchyard.

Joseph built a house in the village, opposite to where the church now stands. In the 1980s and 1990s the house was turned into a country hotel, but it has since returned to being a private residence. For a brief time in the 1840s Joseph employed a teacher to teach the village children but this ceased after his sister Ann Shepherd (who married her cousin Robert Shepherd) and her family, including 12 children, migrated to South Australia in 1843.

References

External links

Appleton le Moors
Village History and Archive Group
Appleton le Moors Community Woodland
Appleton le Moors Village Hall
Appleton le Moors History and Archive Group new site

Villages in North Yorkshire
Civil parishes in North Yorkshire